Mount Vancouver is a peak in the Southern Alps. At 3,309 metres (10,856 feet) it is New Zealand's fourth highest named summit. It is an elevation on the ridge leading north from Aoraki / Mount Cook (3,724 m), between Mount Dampier (3,440 m) and the Clarke Saddle (2,978 m).

The peak is named after Captain George Vancouver, who was part of the second voyage of James Cook in 1773 and who returned in 1791 as commander of the Vancouver Expedition.  The New Zealand Geographic Board adopted the name Mount Vancouver in November 1953.

See also
 List of mountains of New Zealand by height

References

Southern Alps
Westland District
Mountains of Canterbury, New Zealand
Mountains of the West Coast, New Zealand